Raphé can refer to:
 Rafe, a diacritic ֿ a short horizontal overbar placed above certain letters to indicate that they are to be pronounced as fricatives
 Raphe, scientific term